Dale Carlson is an American football coach and former college player.  He served as the head football coach at Lakeland College—now known as Lakeland University—in Plymouth, Wisconsin, from 1987 to 1989, Taylor University from 1990 to 1993, Tri-State University—now known as Trine University—from 1995 to 2002, Ohio Dominican University from 2003 to 2009, and Valparaiso University from 2010 to 2013, and Lindenwood University – Belleville from 2015 to 2016. In 2021, Carlson was the wide receivers coach for the Linemen of the Spring League.

Personal life
Carlson played linebacker during college at Concordia University Chicago, where he earned a Bachelor of Arts degree in physical education. He earned a Master of Science in Education from Chicago State University.

Coaching career 
Carlson began his coaching career as an offensive line coach at Elmhurst College from 1982 to 1984. He then moved to Franklin College for the 1984 season and Grand Valley State University from 1985 to 1987, serving in the same role as offensive line coach.

Carlson became the head coach at Lakeland College in Sheboygan, Wisconsin, in the spring of 1987.  He spent three seasons with Lakeland, before taking the head coach position at Taylor University in Upland, Indiana.

After leaving Taylor, he was tasked with founding the football programs at Tri-State University, now known as Trine University. Carlson spent eight seasons guiding the team and led the team to 11 victories in 1998 plus an NAIA semifinal appearance and a top-three national ranking. He then led the Thunder to the Mid-States Football Association Mideast Conference title in 2001 and was named the conference Coach of the Year.

In 2003, Carlson was named head coach at Ohio Dominican University in Columbus, Ohio, and again placed in a position to build a football program at ODU like he did at Trine. Despite a 0–10 inaugural season, he quickly led the program into a prominent position in the NAIA and an undefeated regular season during the 2007 season and advanced to the quarterfinals of the national playoffs. The 2007 season also saw Carlson earn Conference Coach of the Year and was named the American Football Coaches Association Region II and American Football Monthly/Schutt Sports NAIA National Coach of the Year. Under Carlson, ODU led all of college football with an average of more than 50 points per game. While guiding the Panthers, Carlson produced five All-Americans, seven Academic All-Americans, and more than 90 All-Conference players in his six years.

Carlson was named the 16th head football coach in at Valparaiso University until his firing near the end of 2013 season. Following the stint with Valparaiso, Carlson returned to his native Chicago, Illinois, to serve as the assistant head coach at North Park University.

Carlson returned to head coaching in 2015 when he became the second head coach in program history at Lindenwood University – Belleville, The 2015 season, marked the first for the Lynx in the Mid-States Football Association.

Carlson has been active in the American Football Coaches Association and the Fellowship of Christian Athletes.

Head coaching record

Notes

References

Year of birth missing (living people)
Living people
American football linebackers
Concordia Cougars football players
Elmhurst Bluejays football coaches
Franklin Grizzlies football coaches
Grand Valley State Lakers football coaches
Lakeland Muskies football coaches
Lindenwood–Belleville Lynx football coaches
Ohio Dominican Panthers football coaches
Taylor Trojans football coaches
Trine Thunder football coaches
Valparaiso Beacons football coaches
Chicago State University alumni
Lindenwood University people